Dozular (also, Birges and Dosular) is a village and municipality in the Goygol Rayon of Azerbaijan on the unpaved track between Chayli and Chaykand.  It has a population of 518. Dozular has an old bridge and houses made of distinctive purple, grey and cream stone

References 

Populated places in Goygol District